San Rafael Las Flores is a municipality in the Santa Rosa Department of Guatemala. As of 2020 has a population of 13,620.

The El Escobal silver mine, operated by Pan American Silver, is nearby. The community of San Rafael Las Flores has been heavily involved in the Escobal mine protests.

References

Municipalities of the Santa Rosa Department, Guatemala